
Wolf City is the fifth studio album released by the German rock band Amon Düül II.

Like its predecessor, Carnival in Babylon, Wolf City is a more conventional recording than the band's earlier albums, with shorter track times and more straightforward song structures. This was likely due to the band's increasing commercial popularity, both at home and in the UK. Despite this, some of the album's tracks, such as "Jail-House-Frog" and "Deutsch Nepal", are still overtly experimental.
The US LP has the sides reversed. Side one begins with "Wolf City" and side two with "Surrounded by the Stars". (However, the covers show the correct track order.)

Track listing

Bonus tracks on Gamma CD reissue (83803):

Bonus tracks on 2007 Revisited CD reissue (SPV 305372):

Personnel

Amon Düül II
Renate Knaup-Krötenschwanz – vocals
Chris Karrer – guitars, soprano saxophone, violin
John Weinzierl – guitars
Falk-Ulrich Rogner – organ, clavioline, synthesizer
Lothar Meid – bass, vocals, synthesizer
D. Secundus Fichelscher – drums, vocals, guitars

Guest personnel
Jimmy Jackson – choir organ, piano
Olaf Kübler – soprano saxophone, vocals
Peter Leopold – synthesizer, timpani, vocals
Al Sri Al Gromer – sitar
Pandit Shankar Lal – tablas
Liz van Neienhoff – tambura
Paul Heyda – violin
Rolf Zacher – vocals

References

Amon Düül II albums
1972 albums